Neu Samara was a colony of Plautdietsch-speaking Mennonites in the Orenburg region of Russia.

Founding
Neu Samara was formed by Mennonite settlers of Plautdietsch language, culture and ancestry in 1891-92 who came from the Molotschna mother colony on the Sea of Azov in Ukraine. Initially twelve villages were founded: Kamenetz, Pleschanowo, Krassikowo, Kaltan, Lugowsk, Podolsk, Donskoj, Dolinsk, Jugowka, Klinok, Kuterlja, Bogomasowo. About 500 families totaling 2,600 individuals made up the initial settlement. Later three additional villages were formed: Annenskoje, Wladimirowka und Ischalka. In the 1950s Annenskoje, Kamenetz und Wladimirowka were dissolved.

In spite of the initial economic difficulties, the colony was prospering by the beginning of World War I. By 1917 there were 14 villages and nine estates with a total of 32,600 ha (80,600 acres) and a population of 3,670. A Mennonite congregation was formed in 1891 at Pleschanowo, which had 1,034 baptized members in 1905, along with another 2,689 unbaptized attendees. Elder Daniel Boschmann led the congregation.

The Mennonite Brethren congregation in Lugowsk built a very beautiful church building in 1901 that is now used as government administrative offices. Abraham Martens was elder of this congregation. An Alliance Church In Donskoj later became a Mennonite Brethren congregation.

Civil war and famine
Neu Samara came through the Russian Civil War with relatively little suffering. Along with all of Russia, Neu Samara suffered through the Russian famine of 1921. They received food aid from North American Mennonites through the American Mennonite Relief program. A key organizer of this relief effort was Canadian Cornelius F. Klassen who grew up in Neu Samara. The easing political and economic conditions of the 1920s permitted a wave of around 700 people to immigrate to Canada and Paraguay. The basis for the immigration lay in increasing religious repression and economic stagnation.

Religious persecution
Religious persecution increased considerably in 1931-32 when all churches were closed. The Germans of Neu Samara endured more suffering through the collectivization and dekulakization programs. Herds of cattle died mainly because of the lack of supplies and feed. In early 1931 land was tilled using cows as draft animals.

World War II
The most difficult period came with World War II. Neu Samara was not purged to the extent of other German settlements, but almost the whole adult population was evicted to forced labor camps. The remaining villagers needed to replace the absent workers, leaving much of the work to 13- and 14-year-old children. Many never returned from the labor camps after the war.

Krasnogwardejskij District
In spite of the economic difficulties the situation of the residents gradually improved. On 1 January 1967 Neu-Samara became part of the newly formed Krasnogwardejskij District (previously Neu-Samara belonged to the Sorotschinsker District). The district's administrative center is Pleschanowo. Pleschanowo and nearby Donskoj have grown significantly since 1967, and include many non-Germans. Other villages have also increased in population. Podolsk und Lugowsk have grown into a single town. Most villages now have more than the original central street.

Collective farms and prosperity
The economy of Neu Samara has been based on collective farming since collectivization of private property. After a few years with only one collective farm for the whole settlement, each village formed its own collective. In the 1950s there was another expansion of collective farms. In the end, all of the German villages except Ischalka divided into one of three collectives: "Komsomolez" centered in Bogomasowo, "Karl Marx" centered in Podolsk and "Saweti Lenina" centered in Pleschanowo. A great part of the income came from the villagers' own ¼ and later ½ ha (0.6, later 1.2 acre) parcels, which they could manage themselves and sell the surplus at the market. This extra income allowed them to purchase automobiles and motorbikes.

Religious tolerance
Religious persecution eased for a short time after World War II. Baptisms and church service could be performed during that time. Another atheism campaign started at the end of the 1950s. A gradual loosening of this policy didn't occur until the 1970s. Congregations were formed again during this time, most of which registered as Baptist churches. The leadership at this time included elder Daniel Janzen of Donskoj.

Immigration
The second greatest wave of immigration has happened since 1998. In 1990 there were 7,434 residents of German background in Neu Samara. By the end of the 1990s almost all of these Germans had moved to Germany. Today almost no one of German heritage lives in these villages.

External links
Neu Samara

Cities and towns in Orenburg Oblast
Mennonitism in Russia
Populated places established in the 1890s
1890s establishments in the Russian Empire